Tiracizine is an antiarrhythmic agent.

Carbamates
Dibenzazepines
Carboxamides
Dimethylamino compounds